The International Pageant of Pulchritude, also known as Miss Universe or the International Beauty Contest, was a beauty contest that began in 1920, featuring contestants from multiple nations. This pageant originated the title "Miss Universe" and was the first international contest. The last pageant event in the United States was held in 1931 and additional Miss Universe events were held until 1935. The contest served as a model for modern contests that began after World War II.

The contest originated in Galveston, Texas, United States. The last Miss Universe event of this pre-World War II era was held in Brussels, Belgium. Though this contest served as a model and inspiration for the modern Miss Universe contests, the modern organization has no direct affiliation with these older contests.

History

During the early 20th century, the island city of Galveston, still recovering from the devastating Hurricane of 1900, launched efforts to strengthen its tourism industry building new venues such as the famed Hotel Galvez and organizing regular waterfront events.

Beauty contests had existed around the U.S. since the 19th century as a means to build tourism for local communities. These events were generally local affairs featuring women from the communities themselves. In 1920 promoter C.E. Barfield organized a new event in Galveston known as "Splash Day". The event featured a "Bathing Girl Revue" competition as the centerpiece of its attractions. "Splash Day" was the kick-off of the summer tourist season in the city and was carried forward annually. At its height the event was one of the nation's largest beauty contests and would literally triple the island's population during the weekend when it ran, attracting spectators from around the nation.

A trend toward national beauty contests developed in many nations such as Turkey, France, and Brazil, as well as the United States where both the Galveston event and the younger Miss America event in Atlantic City attracted contestants from around the nation. In 1926, taking advantage of this trend, the Galveston event became an international competition known as the International Pageant of Pulchritude. The winner of the contest was awarded the title of Miss Universe. In 1927 the contest became two separate events held over two days: one to award the title of "Miss United States" and one to award Miss Universe. The Miss United States pageant drew contestants from as far away as New York and Utah. The "Miss Universe" pageant included contestants from a variety of countries including England, Russia, Turkey, Austria, Egypt, Thailand, Philippines, Hong Kong, Japan, Brazil and many others. Prizes were given to the top competitors. In 1929, for example, "Miss Universe" was given US$2000 in gold (US$,000 in today's terms) and a silver plaque.

The event became an international sensation although, ironically, the national media in the United States gave the event far less attention than the press in some other countries. The media in Brazil was particularly enamored with the 1929 contest. Huge crowds were reported near the offices of Brazil's major newspapers awaiting word of the fate of Miss Brazil. She did not, however, even place in the contest. Angered, Brazil hosted its own "Miss Universe" contest in 1930 leading to two separate titleholders in that year. In the Brazilian event, "Miss United States" was unable to place in the competition.

The event in Galveston was discontinued in 1932 because of the Great Depression. "Miss Universe" events were instead held in Belgium in 1932 and 1935. After 1935 international competitions were discontinued until the modern Miss Universe contest was created in 1952 in California.

Titleholders
The following were the titleholders for the annual pageants.

Miss United States

Miss Universe
The pageant was not held during 1933 and 1934.

Legacy
The Pageant of Pulchritude served as a model for modern pageants. Though beauty contests were common even in the 19th century, the Galveston event was the first international contest. It was also one of the first national contests in the United States.

A 2006 documentary entitled Miss Universe 1929 - Lisl Goldarbeiter: A Queen in Wien was released in Hungary detailing the life of the 1929 Miss Universe. That year is regarded by some as the first truly international event as it became the first year to garner substantial worldwide media attention and was the first year a non-American won the title. Additionally, Goldarbeiter's win is historically notable because she was a Jew in an era when antisemitism was popular in the U.S. and Europe.

The title of the pageant was parodied by science-fiction author Keith Laumer in his story "Retief and the Pangalactic Pageant of Pulchritude".

In 2009, a local Galveston organization known as "Islander By Choice" resurrected the pageant on a much smaller scale. The new contest, known as the Galveston Island Beach Revue, features local contestants in 1920s-era swimwear as well as contemporary swimwear. , the contest has continued to be an annual event.

Gallery

See also
 List of beauty contests

Notes

References

External links

 Miss Universe 1929
 Miss Universe 1920s
 Galveston Island Beach Revue (2009 revival)
 Home movie of the 1931 Pageant of Pulchritude - Dorothy Lamour appears as Miss New Orleans
 1925 Film of the Galveston Bathing Girl Revue 

 
Beauty pageants in the United States
History of Galveston, Texas
Culture of Galveston, Texas
1926 establishments in the United States
1936 disestablishments in the United States
International beauty pageants